CETMAR (or Centro de Estudios Tecnológicos del Mar) is a chain of Mexican high schools (known in Mexico as ) which offers programs to upgrade the regular degree to a technical-professional level. CETMAR has campuses located in 16 states.

All CETMAR—jointly with all CETAC high schools—are part of the technical school of the Educación en Ciencia y Tecnología del Mar (DGECyTM), and are dependent of Secretaría de Educación Pública of Mexico.

Careers

The CETMAR offers technical careers is several fields like accountancy, construction, education, cosmetology, tourism, etc. These careers differ in each school.

Location

There are 30 CETMAR in Mexico.

See also
 CBTA (Centro de Bachillerato Tecnológico Agropecuario)
 CBTF (Centro de Bachillerato Tecnológico Forestal)
 CBTIS (Centro de Bachillerato Tecnológico Industrial y de Servicios)
 CEB (Centro de Estudios de Bachillerato)
 CETAC (Centro de Estudios Tecnológicos en Aguas Continentales)
 CETIS (Centro de Estudios Tecnológicos Industrial y de Servicios)
 PFLC (Preparatoria Federal Lázaro Cárdenas)
 PREFECO (Preparatoria Federal por Cooperación)

External links
DGETI

References

High schools in Mexico